In some cultures, the foot of a rabbit is carried as an amulet believed to bring good luck. This belief is held by individuals in a great number of places around the world, including Europe, China, Africa, and North and South America. In variations of this superstition, the donor rabbit must possess certain attributes, such as having been killed in a particular place, using a particular method, or by a person possessing particular attributes (e.g., by a cross-eyed man).

It has been suggested by Benjamin Radford that the rabbit's foot could be connected to a European good luck charm called the Hand of Glory, a hand cut from a hanged man and then pickled.

Humorist R. E. Shay is credited with the witticism, "Depend on the rabbit's foot if you will, but remember it didn't work for the rabbit."

In North American culture
The belief in North American folklore may originate in the system of folk magic known as "hoodoo". A number of strictures attached to the charm are now observed mostly in the breach, namely that it must be the left hind foot of a rabbit which was shot or otherwise captured in a cemetery. Some sources tell that the rabbit must be taken by the full moon, and others specifying the new moon. Some say instead that the rabbit must be taken on a Friday, or a rainy Friday, or Friday the 13th. Some sources say that the rabbit should be shot with a silver bullet, while others say that the foot must be cut off while the rabbit is still alive.

The various rituals suggested by the sources, though they differ widely one from another, share a common element of the uncanny, and the reverse of what is considered good-omened and auspicious. A rabbit is an animal into which shapeshifting witches such as Isobel Gowdie claimed to be able to transform themselves. Witches were said to be active at the times of the full and new moons.

These widely varying circumstances may share a common thread of suggestion that the true lucky rabbit's foot is actually cut from a shapeshifted witch. The suggestion that the rabbit's foot is a substitute for a part from a witch's body is corroborated by other folklore from hoodoo. Willie Dixon's song "Hoochie Coochie Man" mentions a "black cat bone" along with his mojo and his John the Conqueror: all are artifacts in hoodoo magic. Given the traditional association between black cats and witchcraft, a black cat bone is also potentially a substitute for a human bone from a witch. Hoodoo lore also uses graveyard dust, soil from a cemetery, for various magical purposes. Dust from a good person's grave keeps away evil; dust from a sinner's grave is used for more nefarious magic. The use of graveyard dust may also be a symbolic appropriation of the parts of a corpse as a relic, and a form of sympathetic magic.

Rabbit's feet were also considered lucky because of their association with the dead body of a criminal. According to Newbell Niles Puckett, a 20th-century folklorist, “the more wicked the person who is dead, the more effective the charm associated with his remains." Puckett observed that during the 1884 election campaign of Grover Cleveland, he was said to have received the foot of a rabbit that had been killed on the grave of Jesse James, the American outlaw.

In any case, the rabbit's foot is dried out and preserved, and carried around by gamblers and other people who believe it will bring them luck. Rabbit's feet, either authentic or imitation, are frequently sold by curio shops and vending machines. Often, these rabbit's feet have been dyed various colors, and they are often turned into keychains. Few of these rabbit's feet carry any warranty concerning their provenance, or any evidence that the preparers have made any effort to comply with the rituals required by the original tradition. Some may be confected from fake fur and latex "bones". President Theodore Roosevelt wrote in his autobiography that he had been given a gold-mounted rabbit's foot by John L. Sullivan, as well as a penholder made by Bob Fitzsimmons out of a horseshoe. A 1905 anecdote also tells that Booker T. Washington and Baron Ladislaus Hengelmuller, the ambassador from Austria, got their overcoats confused when they were both in the White House to speak with President Roosevelt; the ambassador noticed that the coat he had taken was not his when he went to the pockets searching for his gloves, and instead found "the left hind foot of a graveyard rabbit, killed in the dark of the moon."  Other newspaper stories reported the incident, but omitted the detail about the rabbit's foot.

In addition to being mentioned in blues lyrics, the rabbit's foot is mentioned in the American folk song "There'll Be a Hot Time in the Old Town Tonight", once popular in minstrel shows; one line goes: "And you've got a rabbit's foot To keep away de hoo-doo".

A related good luck ritual in Britain and the United States is to say "rabbit rabbit rabbit" upon waking on the first day of a month, to bring good luck over the remainder of that month.

See also
 The Rabbit's Foot Company (also known as the Rabbit's Foot Minstrels)
 Good luck charm
 Four-leaf clover
 Horseshoe

References

American folklore
Amulets
Animal products
Canadian folklore
Hoodoo (spirituality)
Lucky symbols
Talismans